The William E. Harmon Foundation Award for Distinguished Achievement Among Negroes, commonly referred to as the "Harmon award" or "Harmon Foundation award", was a philanthropic and cultural award created in 1926 by William E. Harmon and administered by the Harmon Foundation. It was offered for distinguished achievements in eight different fields: literature, music, fine arts, business and industry, science and innovation, education, religious service, and race relations. Although awards were created in eight categories, it is best known for its recognition of African-American art of the Harlem Renaissance, and particularly of the visual arts.

A description of the bronze medal won by A.M.E. Bishop John Fletcher Hurst in 1926 appeared in the January 8, 1927, edition of the Afro-American, published in Baltimore, Maryland:

The medal is of unusually beautiful design. On the obverse side is embossed a ship in full sail on the open sea with the inscription "Harmon Foundation" around the margin. On the reverse side are the words "Inspiration, Achievement Religious Service. Second award, 1926, John Hurst".

A full list of the winners of each year was offered in contemporary New York Times articles.

Notes

References
 Armstrong, Samuel Chapman. (1931). The Southern workman, Volume 60.
 Barksdale, Richard  Kenneth (1992). Praisesong of  survival: lectures and essays, 1957-89. University of Illinois Press.  
 Brawley, Benjamin Griffith (1966) The Negro genius: a new appraisal of the achievement of the  American Negro in Literature and the Fine Arts. Biblo-Moser.  
 Calo, Mary Ann. (2007). Distinction and Denial: Race, Nation, and the Critical Construction of the African American Artist, 1920-40. University of Michigan Press.  
 Dykeman, Wilma (1976). Seeds Of Southern Change: The Life Of Will Alexander. W. W. Norton and Company, Inc.  
 Gates, Henry Louis & Evelyn Brooks Higginbotham (eds) (2009). Harlem Renaissance lives from the African  American national biography. Oxford University Press, USA.  
 Guzman, Jessie Parkhurst & Jones, Lewis W. (Eds.) (1952). Negro Year Book: A Review of Events Affecting Negro Life. WM. H. Wise &  Co., Inc.
 "Harmon Award Presented" (Feb 19, 1930). New York Times, pg. 19.
 "Holsey shares Harmon Award with employees of New York office". Afro-American, Saturday February 21, 1931, p. 1.
 Johnson, Charles Spurgeon & Carter, Elmer Anderson (1969). Opportunity: Journal of Negro life, (1969) Volumes 5-6. p. 20.
 Jones, Allen W. (1979). Thomas M. Campbell: Black Agricultural Leader of the New South. Agricultural History Vol. 53, No. 1, Southern Agriculture Since the Civil War: A Symposium, pp. 42–59.
 Leininger-Miller, Theresa (2001). New Negro Artists in Paris: African American Painters and Sculptors in the City of Light, 1922–1934, Rutgers University Press.  .
 Lewis, Samella (2003).  African American Art and Artists. University of California Press. 
 Otfinoski, Steven (2011) African Americans in the Visual Arts. New York: Facts on File. * Wintz, Cary D. & Finkelman, Paul. (2004). Encyclopedia of the Harlem Renaissance. Volume 1. Routledge  
 Wintz, Cary D. & Finkelman, Paul. (2004). Encyclopedia of the Harlem Renaissance. Volume 2. Taylor & Francis Group. 
 Woodson, C. G. (1950). Harry Thacker Burleigh. The  Journal of Negro History, Vol. 35, No. 1, pp. 104–105
 Work, Monroe Nathan & Guzman, Jessie Parkhurst (1937). Negro year book: an annual encyclopedia of the Negro 1937-1938. Tuskegee Institute, Ala.: Negro Year Book Publishing Co.

Footnotes

W
W
Awards established in 1926
Awards honoring African Americans